Charlie Peace may refer to:

 Charlie Peace (comics), a comic strip in the UK comic Buster
 Charlie Peace (novel), a comic novel by British writer Paul Pickering
 Charles Peace (1832–1879), English burglar and murderer